Hylaeus nubilosus is a species of insect within the genus Hylaeus. It is commonly referred to as the cloudy masked bee.

Description
Hylaeus nubilosus is a medium-sized (6–9 mm) masked bee with a conspicuous yellow thoracic badge in the middle of the scutellum and metanotum.

Range
Endemic to the eastern States of Australia. It is also recorded from several suburban sites in the Perth region of southwestern Western Australia.

Habitat
Hylaeus nubilosus prefers to nest in abandoned nests of mud-dauber wasps such as Sphecidae and potter wasps Eumeninae.

References

Insects described in 1853
Colletidae
Insects of Australia